Adam Botsford, better known by his stage name Botzy, is a rapper based out of Minneapolis, Minnesota. He is a former member of Culture Cry Wolf.

Career 
Botzy's work on The Best Love Is Free event and compilation CD has had a significant impact on the Minneapolis music scene, and is entering its fifth year of increasing turns outs.

His video for "Couldn't Breathe (feat. Lizzo)" was premiered on URB, and was labeled a "throwback kind of affair". His album Buck Fotzy was distributed by Fake Four Inc. on July 9, 2013.

Botzy quickly followed up "Buck Fotzy" with a 6 track EP titled "Past Tense", as a gift to his fans for their recent support.

In 2014, Botzy is set to release a collaborative EP with MunQs under the group name "VAYNS", as well as solo EP produced by 2% Muck. He was also working towards a full length album featuring production by Wesley Opus and Cecil Otter.

Discography

Albums 
 Deaf to the Static (2010)
 Buck Fotzy (Fake Four Inc., 2013)
 Still Not Dead Yet (Polkadot Mayhem, 2015)

Mixtapes 
 My Friends and I (2011)
 I'll Be Underground When I'm Dead (Vol. 1) (2014)

EPs 
 Botzy's Birthday EP (2012)
 Past Tense (2013)
 £¡bel (2014)

References

External links 
 

1986 births
Living people
Rappers from Minneapolis
21st-century American rappers